Due to the political status of Taiwan, the Republic of China (ROC) competed as Chinese Taipei at the 1994 Winter Olympics in Lillehammer, Norway.  The International Olympic Committee mandates that the Chinese Taipei Olympic Committee flag is used, and not the flag of the Republic of China.

Competitors
The following is the list of number of competitors in the Games.

Bobsleigh

References

Sources
Official Olympic Reports
 Olympic Winter Games 1994, full results by sports-reference.com

Nations at the 1994 Winter Olympics
1994
1994 in Taiwanese sport